The 2004 Monmouthshire County Council election were held on 10 June 2004 to Monmouthshire County Council in southeast Wales, on the same day of the European Elections. The election was preceded by the 1999 elections and followed by the 2008 elections.

Background 
The Conservatives  formed a minority administration from the previous county council election in May 1999, being largest group on the council by one seat.

Following two by-elections in 2002 (the Conservatives losing one seat to the Liberal Democrats and Labour taking a seat from an Independent), the Labour party became the largest group by one seat.

Having secured the support of Independent and Liberal Democrat councillors, Labour formed a minority administration from July 2002 until the election in June 2004.

IN June 2004 the whole council was up for election and following boundary changes the number of seats was increased to 43.

Overview of results
The Conservatives gained overall control of the council from a previous minority Labour administration.

After the election, the composition of the council was:
Conservative 23
Labour 9
Liberal Democrats 4
Plaid Cymru 2
 Independents 5

The election results were noticeable seeing two Plaid Cymru councillors elected in Caldicot, a first for the Welsh nationalists in heavily anglicised Monmouthshire, and the election of a 21-year-old student, Matthew Jones , for the Liberal Democrats in Chepstow.

The Labour party suffered heavy losses to the Conservatives, the Liberal Democrats, Plaid Cymru and Independents.

The election result saw a fragmentation of the non-conservative vote; the emergence of the Liberal Democrats and Plaid Cymru onto the council. Of note was the number of close races in individual wards, as well as several individual contests where the winning candidate polled far less than a majority of the votes cast.

Election results table(s)

  

|}

  

|}

|}

Electoral division (ward) results

References
 Close call in 'swing' County, BBC News article, May 18, 2004 
Monmouthshire County Council, table of results for 2004 elections.
Monmouthshire County Council, list of councillors.
Article on County Council election results 2004 by local Monmouth news website www.towncrier.org. 
Monmouthshire County Council election results 2004, South Wales Argus 
BBC results table 2004 

2004 Welsh local elections
2004
21st century in Monmouthshire